Stow Creek is an  tributary of Delaware Bay in Salem and  Cumberland counties, New Jersey in the United States.

The creek forms part of the border between Salem and Cumberland Counties.

It empties into Delaware Bay at the ghost town of Bayside; the actual mouth has moved northward as erosion has cut open a loop of the creek.

See also
List of rivers of New Jersey

References

Rivers of Cumberland County, New Jersey
Rivers of New Jersey
Rivers of Salem County, New Jersey
Tributaries of Delaware Bay